Turecki may refer to:

 Turek County
 Gustavo Turecki (born 1965), Canadian psychiatrist and professor